Leptodactylus ventrimaculatus is a species of frogs in the family Leptodactylidae.

It is found in Colombia and Ecuador.
Its natural habitats are subtropical or tropical dry forests, subtropical or tropical moist lowland forests, subtropical or tropical moist montane forests, rivers, freshwater marshes, intermittent freshwater marshes, pastureland, rural gardens, urban areas, heavily degraded former forest, seasonally flooded agricultural land, and canals and ditches.

References

ventrimaculatus
Amphibians of Colombia
Amphibians of Ecuador
Amphibians described in 1902
Taxonomy articles created by Polbot